Avilov (masculine) or Avilova (feminine) may refer to:
Avilov (surname) (fem. Avilova), Russian last name
Avilov (rural locality), several rural localities in Russia
Avilov Formation, a fossiliferous stratigraphic unit in Ukraine